Yunia is a genus of extinct vascular plants from the Early Devonian (Pragian or Siegenian stage, around ). It was first described from the Posongchong Formation of Yunnan, China. The leafless plant consisted of spiny stems, some 2 to 5 cm wide, which branched dichotomously at wide angles in a cruciate arrangement. Each stem contained vascular tissue with one or two strands of protoxylem. The spore-forming organs (sporangia) were elongated and borne on short stalks. The spores had a  relatively smooth sculptural pattern and were trilete (i.e. each spore has three lines on it resulting from its formation in a tetrahedral set of four spores).

In 2004, Crane et al. published a simplified cladogram for the polysporangiophytes in which Yunia is basal to the lycophytes (clubmosses and relatives). It had previously been placed in the "trimerophytes" (a group now thought to be paraphyletic), which were considered to have given rise to all the other vascular plants except the lycophytes.

Hao and Xue in 2013 considered the genus as a questionable zosterophyll.

References

External links
 Cladogram from 

Early Devonian plants
Zosterophylls
Prehistoric lycophyte genera